The Tyrrel Corporation were an English recording duo, composed of members Joe Watson (vocals/keyboards) and Tony Barry (keyboards). The group took their (misspelled) name from a fictional company in the 1982 film Blade Runner.

Career
Between 1992 and 1995, five of the group's singles charted on the UK Singles Chart. Their most successful release was 1995's "Better Days Ahead", which reached the top 30.  The group recorded two albums, North East of Eden (1992), and Play for Today (1995).

Discography

Albums
North East of Eden (1992) – AUS No. 273
Play for Today (1995)

Singles

References

English house music groups
English pop music groups
Chrysalis Records artists
Musical groups established in 1990
Musical groups disestablished in 1995